Twenty is a compilation album by American rock band Taking Back Sunday, released on January 11, 2019, through Craft Recordings. Its release marks the band's 20th anniversary, and it includes two new recordings, "All Ready to Go", and "A Song for Dan". The band embarked on a world tour in support of the album.

Track listing

Personnel
 Adam Lazzara – lead vocals (all tracks)
 John Nolan – lead guitar, keyboards, vocals (tracks, 1–3; 13–21)
 Shaun Cooper – bass guitar (tracks, 1–3; 13–21)
 Mark O'Connell – drums, percussion (all tracks)
 Eddie Reyes – rhythm guitar (tracks 1–19)
 Fred Mascherino – lead guitar, vocals (tracks, 4–10)
 Matt Rubano – bass guitar (tracks, 4-12)
 Matthew Fazzi – lead guitar, keyboards, vocals (tracks, 11–12)

Production
Mastered by Ted Jensen at Sterling Sound, Nashville
Vinyl cut by Joe Nino-Hernes at Sterling Sound, Nashville

References

2019 compilation albums
Taking Back Sunday albums